Two-Mix (temporarily known as II MIX⊿DELTA) is a Japanese pop duo formed in 1995 by Minami Takayama (vocals and composer) and Shiina Nagano (synthesizer, composer and lyricist). Their style is fast electronic pop.

History 
They met in the early 1990s. Minami, already well-established as a voice actress, was in the indie band Re-X and met Shiina through a friend. Minami released a solo album in 1992, Endless Communication which Shiina contributed to. They formed a group together Es Connexion and released an album. In 1995 they formed Two-Mix.

They have been featured in anime such as Gundam Wing and Detective Conan, in which the title character, Conan Edogawa, is voiced by Minami. They also made a guest appearance as themselves in two episodes, in which they were kidnapped and saved by Conan and his friends.

In 1999, Two-Mix produced Miru Takayama (a cousin of Minami) and in 2000 Miru and Minami formed M*TWO-MinaMiru-.

In 2005, Minami and Shiina were joined by Joe Rinoie as an additional singer and composer, changing the group's name to II MIX⊿DELTA for a limited time. 

In 2008, Shiina started his solo music project ShiinaTactix-Music, featuring different female vocalists, Sanae Kobayashi, Yoko Hikasa and Mutsumi Tamura. 

In 2013, Two-Mix released a digital download single "T-R-Y: Next / Across The End: Platinum Stream" and Shiina composed the music for a song "Rhythm Linkage" with Yoko Hikasa in her album "Hikasa Yoko Collaboration Album Glamorous Songs".

In 2014, Shiina composed the music for a song "Reboot Tactics" with Kaori Sadohara (from Sweet Arms) in their album "Trigger".

In 2020, a 25th anniversary project was announced, the main focus being an all time best compilation album that will be released in February, 2021.

Discography 

 BPM 132 (1995)
 BPM 143 (1996)
 BPM 150 Max (1996)
 Fantastix (1997)
 Dream Tactix (1998)
 Rhythm Formula (1999)
 0G (2001)

External links 
 Official website (King Records)
  (Warner Music Japan)
 
 
 
 
 Two-Mix at MusicMoz

Anime musical groups
Electronic music duos
Japanese musical duos
Japanese electropop groups
Japanese techno music groups
Musical groups established in 1995
Musical groups disestablished in 2009
Musical groups reestablished in 2013
Musical groups from Tokyo
King Records (Japan) artists
Warner Music Japan artists